News at 6:30, is the evening national news programme broadcast Monday to Sunday at 18:30 in Hong Kong by television channel TVB Jade. This programme first aired on TVB Jade on 19 November 1967, with the broadcasting time of 18:30. News at 6:30 can also be watched for free on TVB News' website.

News at 6:30 has aired in high definition every day since 18 March 2013. The  channel aired an extra bulletin, News at 7 instead of News at 6:30 from 2009 to 2015. The bulletin is simulcast on both SD and HD versions of Jade on Saturday and Sunday.

TVB News axes the sports bulletin on the weekday version of News at 6:30 since 3 May 2010.

Broadcasting length
News at 6:30 usually broadcasts for approximately an hour on weeknights and 25 minutes on weekends, followed by Weather Report. On special occasions such as the Handover of Hong Kong, opening of the Hong Kong International Airport, Jiji earthquake, 11 September 2001 attacks and 2008 Sichuan earthquake, the show was extended to one hour.

Notable presenters
Stanley So
Claudia Mo

References

External links
Official website

TVB
TVB original programming
1967 Hong Kong television series debuts
1960s Hong Kong television series
Hong Kong television news shows
Cantonese-language television shows